Rafael Campo (born 1964 New Jersey) is an American poet, doctor, and author.

Life
Rafael Campo is the poetry editor of the Journal of the American Medical Association. He graduated from Amherst College and Harvard Medical School. He formally practiced medicine at Beth Israel Deaconess Medical Center in Boston, Massachusetts and was Associate Professor of Medicine at Harvard Medical School. His writing focuses on themes that promote equality and justice for gay people, people of color, and working-class people.

He served as a resident poet at Brandeis University and the University of Illinois at Champaign-Urbana.  He frequently reads at colleges, including Brown University, Stanford University, and Colby-Sawyer College.
He formerly taught in the Lesley University low-residency MFA writing program in Cambridge, Massachusetts.

Work
His work has served as the inspiration for composers and other artists. His poem "Silence=Death" was set by composer Joseph Hallman and premiered as part of the AIDS Quilt Songbook Project. His work was included in the "Best American Poetry and Pushcart Prize" anthologies and has been published on numerous occasions in periodicals such as The Los Angeles Times, The New York Times Magazine, and The Washington Post "Book World".

Philosophy
Rafael Campo believes that medicine should be about treating patients’ diseases and problems while focusing on their humanity. He claims that it would be wrong for a physician to only focus on “the heartless, purely fact-based narrative we record in their charts”. Instead, Campo hopes to inspire physicians through his work to reflect on the experiences of patients and address their needs appropriately, using poetry. Campo argues that poetry can often be crucial to the healing and recovery process.

Awards
 First Prize 2013 Hippocrates Open International Prize for Poetry and Medicine
 National Poetry Series, the Lambda Literary Award
 1997 Guggenheim Fellowship.

Works
 
 
 
 
 
 

Poetry of Healing: A Doctor's Education in Empathy, Identity, and Desire. W.W. Norton, 1997. ISBN, 0393040097.

See also
 Cuban American literature
 List of Cuban-American writers
 Latino literature 
 American Literature in Spanish

References

External links
Annotations at the NYU Literature, Arts, and Medicine Database of several Campo works, with links to texts and audio of the poet commenting and reading poems ""The Distant Moon", "Technology and Medicine", "Towards Curing AIDS", "What the Body Told".

1964 births
American gay writers
American writers of Cuban descent
Amherst College alumni
Harvard Medical School alumni
Living people
Lambda Literary Award for Gay Poetry winners
Formalist poets
American male poets
Lesley University faculty
20th-century American poets
21st-century American poets
American LGBT poets
20th-century American male writers
21st-century American male writers
Gay poets